Niali (Sl. No.: 92) is a Vidhan Sabha constituency of Cuttack district, Odisha, India.

This constituency includes Niali block, Kantapada block and 8 Gram panchayats (Nagari, Usuma, Khalarda, Korkora, Sainso, Kurangpradhan, Kurangsasan and Harianta) of Barang block.

Elected Members

 

2019: (92): Pramod Kumar Mallick (BJD)
2014: (92): Pramod Kumar Mallick (BJD)
2009: (92): Pramod Kumar Mallick (BJD)

Election results

2019

2014

2009
In 2009 election, Biju Janata Dal candidate Pramod Kumar Mallick defeated Indian National Congress candidate Artratrana Malik by a margin of 50,653 votes.

Notes

References

Assembly constituencies of Odisha
Politics of Cuttack district